Robert Norris (12 March 1875 − 31 March 1940) was an English footballer who played as a left half with Blackpool, Nottingham Forest and Doncaster Rovers in the Football League.

Club career

Blackpool
Norris appeared in Blackpool's first game in the Football League, a 3–1 defeat, on 5 September 1896, at Lincoln City's Sincil Bank.

Nottingham Forest
He moved to Nottingham Forest for the beginning of the 1898–99 season.

Doncaster Rovers
Signed by Doncaster Rovers in 1904 Norris went on to make 23 Football League and FA Cup appearances.

Nottingham Forest
After Doncaster were relegated back to the Midland League at the end of the 1904–05 season, Norris returned to Nottingham Forest, going on a tour of Argentina and Uruguay where they won all 8 games.

Altogether, he made 146 appearances for Forest over his 6-year stay there.

International career
On 31 March 1900, Norris played for a representative English League XI against a Scottish XI at Crystal Palace. He scored an own goal in the 90th minute, giving the Scots the equaliser to draw the match.

Personal life
Norris had a grandson Bob Norris, who both also played for Nottingham Forest.

References

1875 births
1940 deaths
Footballers from Preston, Lancashire
English footballers
Association football wing halves
Blackpool F.C. players
Nottingham Forest F.C. players
Doncaster Rovers F.C. players
English Football League players